JK Eesti Põlevkivi Jõhvi is a now defunct Estonian football club based in Jõhvi and was founded in 1974.

EP Jõhvi became the first Estonian runner-up after the Soviet Union collapse and also they were runners-up in the Estonian Cup 1996.

Eesti Põlevkivi Jõhvi in Estonian football

 Eesti Põlevkivi Jõhvi dissolved and were replaced by Muhumaa JK (they play their home matches in Kuressaare).

References

Eesti Polevkivi Johvi
Eesti Polevkivi Johvi
Association football clubs established in 1974
Jõhvi
1974 establishments in Estonia